Gangadharaiah Parameshwara (born 6 August 1951) is an Indian politician who served as seventh Deputy Chief Minister of Karnataka,  and also the longest-serving President of the Karnataka Pradesh Congress Committee for two consecutive terms.

Early life and education
Parameshwara was born on 6 August 1951, at Gollahalli (now known as Siddartha Nagar) in Tumkur. He was born to Gangamalamma Chikkanna and Former MLC Gangadharaiah Hebbalalu Mariyappa. Gangadharaiah hailed from Hebbalalu village in Amruthuru hobli of Kunigal taluk, now in Magadi taluk of Ramanagara district, before shifting to Gangamalamma's village Gollahalli in Tumakuru rural, Parameshwara is the third sibling after older brother Dr G. Shivaprasad.

He studied primary education at Government School in Gollahalli (Siddartha Nagara) and Heggere, Tumkur. He went to Sri Siddhartha High School at Siddartha Nagar, which was established by his father in 1959. He joined Government Pre-University College in Tumkur and after Pre-University College went on to study for a B.Sc. in agriculture in the University of Agricultural Sciences, Bangalore, followed by an M.Sc. in agriculture at the same college. After Post-Graduating, Parameshwara had briefly worked as Research Assistant in Department of Plant Physiology at the University of Agricultural Sciences, Bangalore. Later, Parameshwara went overseas and obtained a PhD from Waite Agricultural Research Centre, the University of Adelaide in Plant Physiology.

He joined the National Cadet Corps (India) at an early age. He was an athlete, has a record 10.9 seconds of 100 metres race in University of Agricultural Sciences, Bangalore. He represented Gandhi Krishi Vignana Kendra College in Inter-College/University and Karnataka state in Indian level.

Career
Parameshwara was an Administrative Officer in Sri Siddhartha Institute of Technology when he came back from Australia. Before this, Parameshwara had briefly worked as Research assistant in Department of Plant Physiology at UAS, Bangalore.
	
In mid 1988, he helped his father to establish Sri Siddhartha Medical College, Hospital & Research Centre, which was earlier rejected by Medical Council of India & Ramakrishna Hegde's Government but Bangalore University had approved and later Supreme Court of India gave permission to sanction Sri Siddhartha Medical College.

In 1989, for the inauguration of the Sri Siddhartha Medical College, Parameshwara along with the Education Minister S. M. Yahya and Mallikarjun Kharge who was then President of the Sri Siddhartha Education Society, went on to invite Prime Minister Rajiv Gandhi, when Parameshwara went for the third time with S. M. Yahya to meet Prime Minister Rajiv Gandhi, Rajiv Gandhi told Parameshwara to enter politics and eventually S. M. Yahya took Parameshwara to then AICC general secretary Mohsina Kidwai and made him Joint Secretary of Karnataka Pradesh Congress Committee.

Political career

In 1989 Parameshwara won against his nearest rival C. Rajavardhan of Janata Dal in Madhugiri Constituency.
In 1993, Parameshwara served as Minister of State for Sericulture during Veerappa Moily cabinet.
In 1999, Parameshwara set a record in the 1999 election to the Assembly from Madhugiri by winning the seat by a margin of 55,802 votes. It was the biggest victory margin in the elections that year. He polled 71,895 votes and his runner up Gangahanumaiah of Janata Dal (Secular) secured only 16,093 votes. Parameshwara's poll was the highest in the state during 1999 election.
From 1999 to 2004, he has served as Minister of State (Independent Charge) for Higher Education and Science & Technology portfolio's also as Tumkur district incharge Minister in S. M. Krishna Cabinet.
On 18 August 2001, he was inducted as Minister of State for Medical Education (attached to health minister) exchanging Science & Technology for Medical Education with Nafisa Fazal.
On 27 June 2002, Parmeshwar was promoted to cabinet rank by then Chief Minister S. M. Krishna citing that they needed younger face in politics.
On 13 December 2003, he was inducted as Minister of Information & Publicity succeeding Prof. B.K. Chandrashekar.
In 2004, Parmeshwar won against his nearest rival Kenchamaraiah H. of Janata Dal (Secular) in Madhugiri.
From 2007 to 2009, Dr G. Parameshwara served as Congress Working Committee Member.
In 2008, he represented Koratagere as winning against runner up Chandraiah of Janata Dal (Secular).
On 27 October 2010, he was appointed as the President of Karnataka Pradesh Congress Committee replacing R. V. Deshapande.
On 1 July 2014, he got elected to Legislative Council.
On 30 October 2015, he was appointed as Home Minister of Karnataka replacing K. J. George.
On 15 January 2016, Dr G. Parameshwara was appointed as Chikmagalur district incharge Minister.
On 24 June 2017, he resigned as Home Minister along with District incharge Minister of Chikmagalur district  to look after state campaign, He also handover Chairman of Campaign Committee of KPCC to D. K. Shivakumar and remained President of KPCC for the second term.
On 15 May 2018, Dr. G. Parameshwara won from Koratagere constitution as elected MLA Candidate.
On 23 May 2018, Dr. G. Parameshwara took oath as the Deputy Chief Minister of Karnataka.
On 8 June 2018, Dr. G. Parameshwara took incharge of "Home Department of Karnataka (excluding Intelligence),  Bengaluru Development (BBMP, BDA, BWSSB, BMRDA, Directorate of Town Planning from Urban Development Department) and Youth Empowerment & Sports Department".
On 31 July 2018, Dr G. Parameshwara was appointed as District-incharge Minister of Bangalore Urban and Tumkur District.
On 28 Dec 2018, Dr G. Parameshwara had to part with The Home Minister portfolio & The Youth Empowerment and Sports portfolio in order to balance the regional wise distribution of Minister Posts, Dr G. Parameshwara Continued to hold the coveted Bengaluru Development ministry alongside three more portfolios "IT, BT, and Science and Technology; Law, Justice and Human Rights; and Parliamentary Affairs and Legislation".

Karnataka State Universities Act, 2000

Tumkur University 
G. Parameshwara was chairman on board for Karnataka State Universities Act, 2000 and then he was Higher Education minister in S. M. Krishna Cabinet who piloted a Bill (Amending Act 10 of 2004) in February 2004 for an exclusive University in Tumkur.

This act carved out half of Bangalore University to make Tumkur University at Tumkur for Tumkur, Kolar and Bangalore Rural. In the beginning, they created Dr Ambedkar Bhavan for office purposes about 3 years as 200 acres land for the university wasn't available in Tumkur. Later vast land of Govt. Science & Arts College was used for University.

On 12 January 2007, Tumkur University was inaugurated by Governor T. N. Chaturvedi and Chief Minister H. D. Kumaraswamy after 3 years of passing Bill. It was delayed due to lack of infrastructure and funds from the successor coalition government and then  Chief Minister Dharam Singh who had announced the withdrawal of the government order which froze the setting up of Tumkur university.

Positions in political party

Minister in different ministries

Personal life
Parameshwara married Kannika Parameshwari, his friend's sister. The two had met while Parameshwara was studying in Gandhi Krishi Vignana Kendra, later married in 1982 in Tumakuru as per Buddhist norms. He is an Ambedkarite, a follower of BR Ambedkar. Parameshwara believes in Buddhism and its philosophy. Parameshwara is an art collector and artefacts picked up by him on his visits to many places.

Appointments and fellowships
Parameshwara has held various appointments and fellowships. These include:

Deputy Chief Minister of Karnataka
 Home Minister of Karnataka
 President, Karnataka Athletics Association
 Member, Board of Regent, University of Agriculture Science, Bangalore
 Chairman, Sri Siddhartha University (SAHE), Tumkur
 Honorary Joint Secretary, Sri Siddhartha Education Society.
 Chairman, Karnataka Science & Technology Board, Tumkur
 Member, Karnataka Library Authority
 Member, Committee on Open University
 Member, Price Fixation Committee on Agriculture
 Member, Australian Society of Plant Physiology
 Member, Indian Society of Plant Physiology
 Member, Indian Society of Agricultural Science
 Fellow of the Indian Institute of Agricultural Technologists
 Fellow of the Indian Society of Technical Education

Awards
 Karnataka Game Changer Award 2017.(U. K. Karnataka Business Chamber)
 National Unity Award in 1993.
 Distinguished Leadership Award.

See also

References

University of Adelaide alumni
Deputy Chief Ministers of Karnataka
Members of the Karnataka Legislative Council
Karnataka Legislative Council
Karnataka MLAs 1989–1994
Karnataka MLAs 1999–2004
Karnataka MLAs 2004–2007
Karnataka MLAs 2008–2013
Karnataka MLCs 2014–2020
Karnataka MLAs 2018–2023
People from Tumkur
1951 births
Living people
Indian Buddhists
Indian National Congress politicians from Karnataka